Cabezón de la Sal is a municipality located in the autonomous community of Cantabria, Spain. According to the 2007 census, the town has a population of 7,971 inhabitants.

Festivals 

 2 February: Las Candelas in Casar de Periedo
 9 March: La Castañera in Vernejo
 29 June: Saint Peter in Carrejo
 Día de Cantabria or Día de la Montaña (Cantabrian day) celebrated on second Sunday of August.
 16 August: San Roque in La Pesa district in Cabezón de la Sal, Bustablado and Duña.
 12 October El Pilar in Las Casucas (A famous district in the town of Cabezón de la Sal).
 11 November: Saint Martin, patron saint of the town.

Towns
Bustablado
Cabezón de la Sal (Capital)
Cabrojo
Carrejo
Casar
Duña
Ontoria
Periedo
Santibáñez
Vernejo
Virgen de la Peña

External links
Ayuntamiento de Cabezón de la Sal
Cabezón de la Sal - Cantabria 102 Municipios

Municipalities in Cantabria